Dilling is a district of South Kordofan state, Sudan.

References

Districts of Sudan